"1st Time" is a rap single by  rapper Yung Joc. It is the third single  released off his debut album New Joc City. The single features Trey Songz and Marques Houston. The song failed to be as successful as It's Goin' Down, I Know You See It, or Dope Boy Magic. It premiered on BET's Access Granted on Wednesday November 1, 2006, and is receiving growing air and video play.  The video features Eightball & MJG, Doug E. Fresh, Gorilla Zoe, Jody Breeze and Trey Songz.

The lyrics are based on a woman having a sexual experience for the first time with a man controversy sparked because the song was originally written by a teenage songwriter "Lil Will" under Jermaine Dupri's So So Def Imprint.

The song debuted on the Billboard Hot 100 at number 93 in February 2007. On March 2, the song returned to the charts at number 97 and has thus far peaked at number 82.

Charts

Weekly charts

Year-end charts

Certifications

References

External links
"1st Time" Music Video

2006 singles
Yung Joc songs
Marques Houston songs
Trey Songz songs
Bad Boy Records singles
2006 songs